Ellie Reed is an American actress.

Ellie Reed may also refer to:
 Ellie Reed, contestant on series seven of the UK version of The Apprentice

See also
 Eleanor Josaitis (1931–2011), born Eleanor Reed, American activist, co-founder of Focus HOPE
 Elli Burris, born Elli Reed, American soccer player